Walden Guitars is a guitar brand founded in 1996 by Jonathan Lee and KHS Musical Instruments and now owned by Jonathan Lee and Jaco Liao. Walden manufactures steel-string and classical guitars, and Baritone guitars.

History 
Walden Guitars were originally built in the small town of Lilan, nearby Langfang, China. Formed in 1996, Walden Guitars was a collaboration between CFox Guitars, Inc. luthiers Charles Fox and Jonathan Lee, and Taiwan instrument manufacturer KHS Musical Instruments. In 2019, Jonathan Lee, one of the original founders, and Jaco Liao, a long time member of the Walden Guitars team, obtained all rights to the Walden Guitars brand.

References

External links

Guitar manufacturing companies
Guitar manufacturing companies of the United States
Companies based in Portland, Oregon
Companies established in 1996
Musical instruments brands